The Hancock County School District is a public school district based in the community of Kiln, Mississippi (USA).

In addition to Kiln, the district also serves the communities of Diamondhead, Pearlington, sections of Waveland and Bay St. Louis, as well as portions of rural Hancock County. The area includes portions of the former Shoreline Park census-designated place.

Operations
The district previously had its office at 17304 Highway 603 in Kiln.

Schools

High school
Grades 9-12
Hancock High School

Middle school
Grades 6-8
Hancock Middle School

Elementary schools
Grades K-5
East Hancock Elementary School
Hancock North Central Elementary School (formerly Hancock North Central High School)
South Hancock Elementary School (formerly Gulfview-Charles B. Murphy Elementary)
 West Hancock Elementary School

Other Campuses
Grades 10-12
 Hancock County Career Technical Center

Demographics

2006-07 school year
There were a total of 4,265 students enrolled in the Hancock County School District during the 2006–2007 school year. The gender makeup of the district was 48% female and 52% male. The racial makeup of the district was 3.80% African American, 93.76% White, 1.36% Hispanic, 0.80% Asian, and 0.28% Native American. 63.2% of the district's students were eligible to receive free lunch.

Previous school years

Accountability statistics

See also
List of school districts in Mississippi
Hancock North Central High School

References

External links
 

Education in Hancock County, Mississippi
School districts in Mississippi